Pyropelta oluae is a species of small sea snail, a deep-water limpet, a marine gastropod mollusk in the family Pyropeltidae.

Distribution 
This small impet occurs at methane seeps in deep water off the Congo River

References

Pyropeltidae
Gastropods described in 2009